Eric Pele (born October 21, 1969) is a retired American mixed martial artist of Samoan descent and former King of the Cage Super Heavyweight Champion. Pele is also an accomplished tattoo artist who has appeared on the reality television shows "Inked" and "Tattoo Nightmare", with the latter appearing on Spike TV, using the nickname 'Big E'. He has competed in various mixed martial arts organizations including RINGS, MFC, and King of the Cage.

Mixed martial arts career

Early career
Pele made his professional debut in 2000 at the RINGS USA Heavyweight Tournament, defeating Wesley Correira (also making his pro debut) via submission. In the semifinal bout, Pele defeated Roger Neff via decision. In the final, Pele faced then 20-3 Bobby Hoffman. Pele was handed his first professional loss via decision.

King of the Cage
After three more wins, Pele faced Dan Bobish in the main event at KOTC: Cold Blood for the Super Heavyweight title. Pele was defeated after his corner stopped the fight in the second round. 

In 2003, Pele fought again for the title against Dan Christison. Pele won the King of the Cage Super Heavyweight title via first-round TKO.

In his first title defense, Pele defeated Travis Fulton via first-round submission. In 2005, Pele returned to defend his title in a rematch with Bobby Hoffman. Pele avenged his first career loss and title via second-round TKO. Pele was later stripped of the title due to inactivity, and fought Vince Lucero in October of 2006, winning via decision.

BodogFIGHT
Pele was signed by Bodog and slated to face Antonio Silva for BodogFIGHT on December 2, 2006. Pele handed the future UFC title challenger his first professional loss via TKO. After his win over Silva, Pele next faced Alexander Emelianenko on April 14, 2007. Pele was defeated via first-round stoppage. After a win in the regional circuit, Pele returned to Bodog, losing via decision to Akhmed Sultanov.

Maximum Fighting Championship
Pele last competed professionally in May of 2008 against Chase Gormley. Pele was defeated via unanimous decision.

Championships and accomplishments 
King of the Cage
KOTC Super Heavyweight Championship (Two times) 
One successful title defense

Fighting Network RINGS
2000 Rising Stars Heavyweight Tournament Runner-up

Mixed martial arts record

|-
| Loss
| align=center| 11–5
| Chase Gormley
| Decision (unanimous) 
| MFC 16: Anger Management
| 
| align=center| 3
| align=center| 5:00
| N/A
| 
|-
| Loss
| align=center| 11–4
| Akhmet Sultanov
| Decision (unanimous)
| BodogFIGHT: USA vs. Russia
| 
| align=center| 3
| align=center| 5:00
| N/A
| 
|-
| Win
| align=center| 11–3
| Antoine Hayes
| TKO
| IFO: Kimmons vs Yunker
| 
| align=center| 1
| align=center| 2:00
| N/A
| 
|-
| Loss
| align=center| 10–3
| Alexander Emelianenko
| KO (punch)
| BodogFIGHT: Clash of the Nations
| 
| align=center| 1
| align=center| 4:07
| N/A
| 
|-
| Win
| align=center|  10–2
| Antônio Silva
| TKO (punches and elbows)
| BodogFIGHT: USA vs Russia
| 
| align=center| 1
| align=center| 2:40
| N/A
| 
|-
| Win
| align=center|  9–2
| Vince Lucero
| Decision (unanimous)
| Extreme Wars 5
| 
| align=center| 3
| align=center| 5:00
| N/A
| 
|-
| Win
| align=center|  8–2
| Bobby Hoffman
| TKO
| KOTC: Mortal Sins
| 
| align=center| 2
| align=center| 2:55
| N/A
|Defended the King of the Cage Super Heavyweight Championship.
|-
| Win
| align=center|  7–2
| Travis Fulton
| Submission (verbal)
| KOTC 32: Bringing Heat
| 
| align=center| 1
| align=center| 1:35
| N/A
|Defended the King of the Cage Super Heavyweight Championship.
|-
| Win
| align=center|  6–2
| Dan Christison
| TKO
| KOTC 23: Sin City
| 
| align=center| 1
| align=center| 4:50
| N/A
|Won the King of the Cage Super Heavyweight Championship.
|-
| Loss
| align=center|  5–2
| Dan Bobish
| TKO (corner stoppage)
| KOTC 12: Cold Blood
| 
| align=center| 2
| align=center| 1:10
| N/A
|For the King of the Cage Super Heavyweight Championship.
|-
| Win
| align=center|  5–1
| Kauai Kupihea
| TKO (submission to strikes)
| KOTC 11: Domination
| 
| align=center| 1
| align=center| 1:40
| N/A
| 
|-
| Win
| align=center|  4–1
| Sean Alvarez 
| KO
| KOTC 9: Showtime 
| 
| align=center| 3
| align=center| 0:27
| N/A
| 
|-
| Win
| align=center|  3–1
| Ernest Henderson
| TKO (submission to punches)
| GC 1: Gladiator Challenge 1 
| 
| align=center| N/A
| align=center| N/A
| N/A
| 
|-
|  Loss
| align=center|  2–1
| Bobby Hoffman
| Decision (unanimous)
| RINGS USA: Rising Stars Final
| 
| align=center| 3
| align=center| 5:00
| N/A
|RINGS Heavyweight Tournament Final.
|-
| Win
| align=center|  2–0
| Roger Neff 
| Decision (unanimous)
| RINGS: King of Kings 2000 Block B
| 
| align=center| 2
| align=center| 5:00
| N/A
|RINGS Heavyweight Tournament Semifinal.
|-
| Win
| align=center|  1–0
| Wesley Correira
| Submission (armbar)
| RINGS: King of Kings 2000 Block B
| 
| align=center| 2
| align=center| 2:30
| N/A
|RINGS Heavyweight Tournament Quarterfinal.

References

External links
 

1969 births
American male mixed martial artists
Samoan male mixed martial artists
Living people
Sportspeople from Las Vegas
Super heavyweight mixed martial artists
Mixed martial artists utilizing Brazilian jiu-jitsu
American practitioners of Brazilian jiu-jitsu
Samoan practitioners of Brazilian jiu-jitsu
American tattoo artists